Bavarian United SC is an American soccer team based in Milwaukee, Wisconsin, United States. Bavarian Majors of the Bavarian Soccer Club compete in the United Premier Soccer League. The team plays its home games in the athletic stadium at the Heartland Value Fund Stadium. The team's colors are blue and white. Bavarian has won six USASA National Amateur Cup titles as well as two National Open Cup championships and is a frequent qualifier for the Lamar Hunt U.S. Open Cup.

History
The original Milwaukee Bavarians club was formed by German American immigrants in 1929 as Fussball Club Bayern (Football Club Bavaria) as a multi-sports association. Their first football match was played on September 29, 1929 against a team from nearby Sheboygan, resulting in a 3–2 victory for Bayern. The club subsequently became very strong in its area, winning many state championships.

In 1956, the team renamed to Milwaukee Bavarian SC and bought a new field on which to play home matches. They were a charter member of the National Premier Soccer League in 2005.  The team took a hiatus from the NPSL for the 2014 season to focus on completing substantial upgrades to their Heartland Value Fund Stadium. The total upgrades estimated to cost $1.1 million. At the end of that hiatus, they joined the Great Lakes Premier League, which changed its name to the Premier League of America shortly thereafter.

In their first season in the PLA, the Bavarians won both the West Division and League Championships, and had five players named to the West Division Team of the Year.

In 2021, Milwaukee Bavarian merged with Inter Northshore FC and renamed to Bavarian United SC. On February 7, 2023, it was announced that Bavarian would be joining USL League Two and USL W League for the upcoming 2023 season.

National Championships

Bavarian Soccer Club has won nine national championships. In 1976 they won their first National Amateur Cup, when they defeated a team from Trenton, New Jersey 3–1 in the final. They repeated this success in 2001, 2002, 2003, 2018, and 2022. They have also finished as runners-up in this tournament (1983, 2016, and 2017).

In 2018, the Bavarians won the United Premier Soccer League (UPSL) national championship, defeating Sporting AZ FC 3–2 in the championship.

In 2003 the Bavarians also won the USASA National Open Cup amateur championship. The club would win the competition again in 2009. USASA eliminated this national tournament in 2015.

Bavarian SC competed in the 1994 U.S. Open Cup as Bavarian Leinenkugel as they were sponsored by the Jacob Leinenkugel Brewing Company that year.

Year-by-year

Honors
 USASA Werner Fricker Open Cup winner – 2003, 2009 (national competition ceased after 2015)

Head coaches
  Tom Zaiss (1996–2006)
  Jon Mroz (2007–2008)
  Andreas Davi (2009–2011)
  Patrick Hodgins (2012–present)

Stadium
 Heartland Value Fund Stadium; Glendale, Wisconsin (1950–present)

References

External links
 Official website

Sports in Milwaukee
Soccer clubs in Wisconsin
1929 establishments in Wisconsin
United Premier Soccer League teams
Great Lakes Premier League teams
German-American culture in Milwaukee
Association football clubs established in 1929